Levanger Fotballklubb is a Norwegian football club located in Levanger. The club currently plays in the 2. divisjon, the third tier of the Norwegian football league system. Founded 20 May 1996, Levanger FK is the result of a merger between SK Nessegutten and IL Sverre.

Recent history 
{|class="wikitable"
|-bgcolor="#efefef"
! Season
! 
! Pos.
! Pl.
! W
! D
! L
! GS
! GA
! P
!Cup
!Notes
|-
|2006
|2. divisjon
|align=right |12
|align=right|26||align=right|7||align=right|8||align=right|11
|align=right|48||align=right|50||align=right|29
|Third round
|
|-
|2007
|2. divisjon
|align=right |10
|align=right|26||align=right|8||align=right|6||align=right|12
|align=right|44||align=right|61||align=right|30
|First round
|
|-
|2008
|2. divisjon
|align=right |5
|align=right|26||align=right|14||align=right|2||align=right|10
|align=right|47||align=right|49||align=right|44
||Second round
|
|-
|2009
|2. divisjon
|align=right |11
|align=right|26||align=right|10||align=right|2||align=right|14
|align=right|26||align=right|58||align=right|32
||Second round
|
|-
|2010
|2. divisjon
|align=right |10
|align=right|26||align=right|8||align=right|5||align=right|13
|align=right|46||align=right|50||align=right|29
||Second round
|
|-
|2011 
|2. divisjon
|align=right |7
|align=right|26||align=right|12||align=right|3||align=right|11
|align=right|52||align=right|45||align=right|39
||Second round
|
|-
|2012 
|2. divisjon
|align=right |8
|align=right|26||align=right|10||align=right|4||align=right|12
|align=right|53||align=right|48||align=right|34
||First round
|
|-
|2013
|2. divisjon
|align=right |3
|align=right|26||align=right|13||align=right|5||align=right|8
|align=right|61||align=right|43||align=right|44
||Third round
|
|-
|2014 
|2. divisjon
|align=right bgcolor=#DDFFDD| 1
|align=right|26||align=right|16||align=right|6||align=right|4
|align=right|64||align=right|29||align=right|54
||Second round
|Promoted to 1. divisjon
|-
|2015 
|1. divisjon
|align=right |9
|align=right|30||align=right|10||align=right|6||align=right|14
|align=right|48||align=right|53||align=right|36
||Third round
|
|-
|2016 
|1. divisjon
|align=right |8
|align=right|30||align=right|13||align=right|6||align=right|11
|align=right|52||align=right|46||align=right|45
||Second round
|
|-
|2017 
|1. divisjon
|align=right |7
|align=right|30||align=right|10||align=right|12||align=right|8
|align=right|39||align=right|36||align=right|42
||Third round
|
|-
|2018 
|1. divisjon
|align=right bgcolor="#FFCCCC"| 16
|align=right|30||align=right|3||align=right|6||align=right|21
|align=right|32||align=right|71||align=right|15
||Third round
|Relegated to 2. divisjon
|-
|2019 
|2. divisjon
|align=right |5
|align=right|26||align=right|13||align=right|2||align=right|11
|align=right|38||align=right|40||align=right|41
||Third round
|
|-
|2020 
|2. divisjon
|align=right |8
|align=right|13||align=right|5||align=right|4||align=right|4
|align=right|20||align=right|18||align=right|17
||Cancelled
|
|-
|2021 
|2. divisjon
|align=right |4
|align=right|26||align=right|13||align=right|4||align=right|9
|align=right|65||align=right|41||align=right|43
||Second round
|
|-
|2022
|2. divisjon
|align=right |3
|align=right|26||align=right|12||align=right|7||align=right|7
|align=right|62||align=right|38||align=right|43
||Second round
|
|}
Source:

Current squad

References

External links

 Official website
 TOBB Arena Levanger - Nordic Stadiums

Football clubs in Norway
Sport in Trøndelag
Levanger
Association football clubs established in 1996
1996 establishments in Norway